Betwixt & Between is an album by American jazz trombonists Kai Winding and J. J. Johnson featuring performances recorded in 1968 and released on the CTI label. The album features jazz interpretations of popular tunes linked by brief Baroque interludes.

Reception
The Allmusic review by Richard S. Ginell awarded the album 3 stars and stated "there are experiments all over this quintessentially '60s project... A fascinating, no doubt controversial, record".

Track listing
 "Casa Forte/Bach Chorale #237" (Edu Lobo/Johann Sebastian Bach) - 4:20 
 "Betwixt & Between/Plus Nine" (Anthony Dorsey/Kai Winding) - 3:30 
 "Little Drummer Boy/Troika" (Katherine Kennicott Davis/Bach) - 2:10 
 "Don't Go Love, Don't Go/Bach Chorale #241" (J. A. Ryan, Jim Lacy/Bach) - 3:30 
 "Mojave/Bach Chorale #134" (Antônio Carlos Jobim/Bach) - 3:30
 "Stormy" (Buddy Buie, James Cobb) - 2:40
 "Smoky/Onion Rings Rondo" (J. J. Johnson/Kai Winding) - 3:20
 "Wichita Lineman/Bach Invention #4" (Jimmy Webb/Bach) - 3:04 
 "Just a Funky Old Vegetable Bin/Bach Invention #1" (Roger Kellaway/Bach) - 3:20 
 "Willie, Come Home" (J. Millar, R, George) - 3:30
Recorded at Van Gelder Studio in Englewood Cliffs, New Jersey on October 22 & 29, November 15 & 26 and December 5, 1968 and January 9, 1969

Personnel
J. J. Johnson, Kai Winding — trombone, arranger
Marvin Stamm - flugelhorn
Tony Studd - bass trombone
Paul Ingraham - French horn
Herbie Hancock - piano
Charles Covington - organ
Roger Kellaway - clavinet, arranger
Joe Beck, Eric Gale, Stuart Scharf - guitar
Chuck Domanico, Russell George, Chuck Rainey - electric bass
Ron Carter - bass
Leo Morris, Denny Seiwell - drums
Airto Moreira - drums, finger cymbals 
Warren Smith - tambourine
Fred Buldrini, Lewis Eley, Harry Glickman, Emanuel Green, George Ockner, Raoul Poliakin, Max Pollikoff, Joyce Robbins, Aaron Rosand, Tosha Samaroff, Julius Schacter, Jack Zayde - violin

References

CTI Records albums
J. J. Johnson albums
Kai Winding albums
1969 albums
Albums produced by Creed Taylor
Albums recorded at Van Gelder Studio